Eugen Thiele (1897–1938) was an Austrian film director and screenwriter. Of Jewish background he was the younger brother of Wilhelm Thiele. After a spell as an actor he established himself as a director in the Germany film industry of the early 1930s during the final years of the Weimar Republic. The Nazi seizure of power in 1933 brought an effective end to the career of the Jewish Thiele, who went into exile in Prague where he wrote the screenplay for one German-language film The Happiness of Grinzing, and may have also contributed to a German version of the Czech film Romance from the Tatra Mountains. He then returned to his native Austria, living in Baden bei Wien. He died the same year of the Anschluss which brought Austria under Nazi control.

Selected filmography
 Susanne Cleans Up (1930)
 A Woman Branded (1931)
 My Heart Longs for Love (1931)
 Durand Versus Durand (1931)
 Three from the Unemployment Office (1932)
 Grandstand for General Staff (1932)
 The Happiness of Grinzing (1933)

References

Bibliography
 Prawer, S.S. Between Two Worlds: The Jewish Presence in German and Austrian Film, 1910-1933. Berghahn Books, 2007.
 Waldman, Harry. Nazi Films in America, 1933-1942. McFarland, 2008.

External links

1897 births
1938 deaths
German film directors
Austrian film directors
People from Vienna
Austrian people of Jewish descent
Austrian emigrants to Germany
People who emigrated to escape Nazism